Karen Dokhoyan (born on 6 October 1976) is an Armenian former football defender. He currently is one of the coaches and scouts of the Armenian Premier League club Pyunik Yerevan. Karen was also a member of the Armenia national team, and has participated in 48 international matches and scored 2 goals since his debut in an away friendly match against Estonia on 18 August 1999. He is most famous for scoring his goal against Romania to draw 1–1 in a 2006 World Cup qualification match. Karen played for the defunct clubs Malatia Yerevan, Erebuni Yerevan, FC Yerevan, Araks Ararat, for the Russian Krylia Sovetov Samara, and for the Armenian Pyunik F.C.

National team statistics

International goals

Achievements
 Armenian Premier League with FC Yerevan: 1997
 Armenian Premier League with Araks Ararat: 1999
 Armenian Cup with Araks Ararat: 1999
 Russian Premier League bronze medals with Krylia Sovetov Samara: 2004
 Russian Cup finalist with Krylia Sovetov Samara: 2004
 Armenian Supercup with Pyunik Yerevan: 2006
 Armenian Premier League with Pyunik Yerevan: 2007, 2008

External links
 

1976 births
Living people
Footballers from Yerevan
Armenian footballers
Armenia international footballers
Armenian expatriate footballers
PFC Krylia Sovetov Samara players
FC Pyunik players
Expatriate footballers in Russia
Armenian Premier League players
Russian Premier League players
Association football defenders